First Baptist Church, Kingston is a historic church at 4600 Ninth Avenue North in Birmingham, Alabama.  It was built in 1961 and added to the National Register of Historic Places in 2005. The congregation was organized in 1930, it was led by George W. Dickerson from 1941 to 1972, it played a leading role in the Civil Rights Movement and served as a site for mass meetings held by the Alabama Christian Movement for Human Rights. The church is now surrounded by a public housing project erected in the late 1950s.

In 2000, the congregation relocated to a new building at 4240 Ninth Avenue North and sold this structure the next year to Lighthouse Church Ministries.

References

Baptist churches in Alabama
Churches on the National Register of Historic Places in Alabama
National Register of Historic Places in Birmingham, Alabama
Colonial Revival architecture in Alabama
Churches completed in 1961
Baptist churches in Birmingham, Alabama
1961 establishments in Alabama